Bankim Chandra Ghosh is an Indian politician from the Bharatiya Janata Party. In May 2021, he was elected as a member of the West Bengal Legislative Assembly from Chakdaha (constituency). He defeated Subhankar Singha of All India Trinamool Congress by 11,680 votes in 2021 West Bengal Assembly election. In 2019, he joined the Bharatiya Janata Party after the 2019 Indian General election after resigning from the Communist Party of India (Marxist).

References 

Living people
Year of birth missing (living people)
21st-century Indian politicians
People from Nadia district
Bharatiya Janata Party politicians from West Bengal
West Bengal MLAs 2021–2026